Matthew Gary Moulds (born 15 May 1991) is a New Zealand rugby union player who currently plays as a hooker for San Diego Legion in Major League Rugby (MLR) and  in the Bunnings NPC. He has also previously represented New Zealand at rugby sevens.

Club career
Moulds started out his senior career with Northland Taniwha during the 2013 ITM Cup and quickly established himself as a regular member of their starting fifteen.   2014 was a good year for both the Taniwha, who finished 3rd in the Championship standings with 5 wins and 5 losses and for Moulds, who played 10 times and scored 2 tries.

2015 and 2016 saw Moulds captain the Taniwha in what turned out to be 2 disappointing campaigns where they languished near the foot of the log and struggled to find wins.   As captain, however, he was a guaranteed starter and made 16 appearances across the 2 seasons, scoring 1 try.

Impressive performances at provincial level were rewarded in 2015, when he was named in the  wider training group for the 2015 Super Rugby season. The presence of experienced hookers in the shape of All Black James Parsons and the well traveled Quentin MacDonald meant game time was again at a premium for Moulds who had to take the role of third choice rake for the Blues. He did get on the field twice during the season, with both appearances coming from the replacements bench.

Moulds was again named in the Blues squad for 2017 where he would compete with Parsons and  newcomer Hame Faiva for the number 2 shirt.

On 25 April 2019, Moulds moved to England to join Gallagher Premiership side Worcester Warriors on an undisclosed length deal from the 2019–20 season.

On 27 September 2021, Moulds was released by Worcester as he signed for local rivals Gloucester on a short term deal from the 2021-22 season.

On 16 January 2022, after he left Gloucester, Moulds travel to the USA as he signs for San Diego Legion in the Major League Rugby competition.

International career
Moulds was a member of the New Zealand sevens wider training squad in early 2014 and was part of the side which competed in the Wellington Sevens in February 2014.

References

1991 births
Living people
New Zealand rugby union players
Rugby union hookers
Northland rugby union players
Blues (Super Rugby) players
Worcester Warriors players
Male rugby sevens players
New Zealand international rugby sevens players
New Zealand male rugby sevens players
Gloucester Rugby players
San Diego Legion players